Clubhouse Games: 51 Worldwide Classics, known as 51 Worldwide Games in Europe and Australia, is a 2020 party video game developed by NDcube and published by Nintendo for the Nintendo Switch. This game is a successor to Clubhouse Games (2005) for the Nintendo DS and is a compilation of board, card, tabletop, and toy sports games from around the world. Clubhouse Games sold more than four million copies by April 2022.

Gameplay
Upon starting the game, the player chooses a toy figurine as an avatar and assigns a favorite game to it. This allows other players to see a globe where they can pick that game. These figurines act as guides for the games and offer trivia on the game, such as its history.

The compilation of 51 games includes a variety of board, card, tabletop, and toy sports games such as Yacht Dice, Four-in-a-Row, Backgammon, Renegade, Checkers, Chess, Dominoes, Hanafuda, President, Golf, Fishing, Bowling, Darts, and Toy Baseball. Additionally, there is a bonus Piano game included. Various games allow for motion control through the use of the Joy-Con controllers. In solo play, the player plays against CPU opponents if required and can change the difficulty accordingly. An unlockable Mario-themed card deck can be used for certain card games.

Multiple games allow for motion control with the use of the Joy-Con. In solo play, the player plays against CPU opponents (if the game requires them) and can change the difficulty accordingly. Multiplayer games can be played locally in single-system play (with some exceptions) or via local wireless depending on the game. A multiplayer mode called "Mosaic Mode" allows for multiple Nintendo Switch consoles to link together to display one larger multi-monitor picture in games like Slot Cars, where one track is displayed over four screens. Most of the games included can be played online, either with matchmaking modes or lobbies with friends.

"Clubhouse Games Guest Pass", known as "Local Multiplayer Guest Edition" in PAL regions and "Pocket Edition" in Japan, is a free application on the Nintendo eShop which includes all 52 games but with only Dominoes, Four-in-a-Row, President, and Slot Cars available in single player mode. It allows players to create lobbies with others who own the free application, and it allows them to join lobbies hosted by players who own the full game and play any of the multiplayer games available.

Development
Clubhouse Games: 51 Worldwide Classics was developed by NDcube, who had previously developed Super Mario Party for the Nintendo Switch. The game was announced in a Nintendo Direct Mini presentation held on March 26, 2020, with a trailer revealing the complete list of games featured in the compilation. A follow up overview trailer was released in Japan on April 28, 2020, and in North America on May 18, 2020. Certain game elements resemble those seen in the Wii U's E3 2011 reveal trailer, in which Renegade, Checkers, and Chess were shown on the Wii U GamePad. The courses in Golf are recreations of the nine holes from Wii Sports, which themselves were inspired by the courses from Golf for the NES.

Reception
On July 13, 2020, Nintendo published the global popularity statistics of each game, with 1.5 million players of Dots and Boxes .

The game received generally positive reviews, mostly attributed to the presentation, the selection of games available, the large focus on single player content, online features, and matchmaking. The AI for the game was also praised as surprisingly tough. Ben Kuchera of Polygon praised the game selection in a simple package and the tutorials. Christian Donlan of Eurogamer praised the presentation, polish, and atmosphere. Chris Scullion of Nintendo Life commended the online matchmaking's attempt to not keep players waiting by cuing other players in on what games they selected. Common complaints included a lack of 3-to-4 player multiplayer game options, omissions of certain games, obnoxious dialogue and voice acting, and a lack of support for all Nintendo Switch play styles.

Sales
The game reached the top 10 of sales charts for the week of June 1–7, 2020 in Japan with 64,443 copies sold, placing second behind Animal Crossing: New Horizons. Nintendo revealed that total worldwide sales had reached 4.22 million copies as of March 31, 2022, making it the 21st best-selling game on the Nintendo Switch.

Notes

References

External links 

2020 video games
Asymmetrical multiplayer video games
CAProduction games
Casual games
Clubhouse Games
Digital board games
Digital card games
Digital dice games
Multiplayer and single-player video games
NDcube games
Nintendo Switch games
Nintendo Switch-only games
Party video games
Video games developed in Japan
Video games produced by Takashi Tezuka